Ma Man Ching (born 29 May 2002) is a Hong Kong professional footballer who currently plays for Hong Kong Premier League club Rangers.

Career statistics

Club

Notes

References

Living people
2002 births
Hong Kong footballers
Association football midfielders
Hong Kong Premier League players
Resources Capital FC players
HK U23 Football Team players
Hong Kong Rangers FC players